Aarvold is a surname. Notable people with the surname include:

Sir Carl Aarvold (1907–1991), British rugby player, barrister, and Recorder of London
Kari Marie Aarvold Glaser (1901–1972), Norwegian classical pianist and music teacher
Olaf Aarvold (1899–1991), Norwegian Lutheran priest and politician

Norwegian-language surnames